Ali Abdulaziz Halabji (December 28, 1929 – March 17, 2007) was a Kurdish Islamic scholar from Iraqi Kurdistan and one of the founders and second leader of the Kurdistan Islamic Movement.

Life 
He was born on December 28, 1929, in the village of Prisi Saroo in Halabja province to a religious family. At the age of seven, he studied the Qur'an and Sharia law. He studied with his father, Abdulaziz. In 1953, he became an Islamic teacher at his local Mosque alongside his brother Osman Abdulaziz. In 1959 he became the Imam of the Azabani Mosque in Sulaymaniyah, and in 1961 he became the Imam of the Mohammed Pasha Mosque in Halabja. In 1962, he became the director of the Islamic Institute in Halabja. He was later exiled by the Ba'athist Iraqi government to Anbar, Fallujah, Ziqar, and Baghdad for leading the Kurdish mujahideen during in the 1983–1986 Kurdish rebellions in Iraq on the Kurdish rebel side. He later returned to Halabja.

Political career 
In 1987, after his exile, he participated in the establishment of the Kurdistan Islamic Movement and became its deputy leader and head of the military wing. In 1999, he became the leader of the Kurdistan Islamic Movement. On August 8, 2003, he and his brother Mullah Omar Abdulaziz and several bodyguards were arrested by a large US force at his home in Halabja and spent several months in prison for their involvement in the creation of the Islamic Emirate of Byara. After his release, he went to the UK for treatment due to deteriorating health, and he died in the UK on 17 March 2007, and was brought back to Halabja and buried there.

References 

Iraqi Kurdistani politicians
1929 births
2007 deaths
Kurdish nationalists
Kurdish Islamists